Wartkowice  is a village in Poddębice County, Łódź Voivodeship, in central Poland.

The village has a population of 690.

References

Villages in Poddębice County